St Margaret's Church is a medieval church in Ipswich, Suffolk, England. It was built in around 1300 by the Augustinian canons of the adjacent Priory of the Holy Trinity to cater for the increasing population. The building and much of the congregation was located just outside the ramparts to the north of medieval Ipswich.

The building dates from the 15th century, but the tower was rebuilt in the 19th century.

Church organ
The organ was bought in 1981. It had previously been installed in Holy Trinity Church, Bedford, but this church had become redundant in 1974. It was originally installed J. W. Walker & Sons Ltd in 1859. The organ was originally tuned to the Old Philharmonic pitch (A452.5). However this was deflated to the current ISO 16 Stuttgart pitch when the organ was cleaned and repaired in 2012–3.

Patronage
The Simeon Trustees have held the patronage of St Margaret's for a number of years. In 1867 they appointed Samuel Garratt as minister of the church.

References

Grade I listed churches in Ipswich
Church of England church buildings in Ipswich